There were several referendums on independence in 2014:
 2014 Catalan independence referendum
 2014 Crimean status referendum
 2014 Donbass status referendums
 2014 Scottish independence referendum
 2014 Venetian independence referendum

See also
 Independence referendum
 2014 referendum (disambiguation)

Independence